Pickett is a surname.

Pickett may also refer to a place in the United States:

Pickett, Kentucky
Pickett, Oklahoma
Pickett, Wisconsin
Pickett County, Tennessee
Fort Pickett, Virginia

See also
 Picket (disambiguation)
 Picquet (disambiguation)
 Piquet (disambiguation)
 Piquette (disambiguation)